Assi Kalan is a village located in the Ludhiana East tehsil, of Ludhiana district, Punjab. Large number people lived in this village are belong to Jatt community . The village has a govt school, a playground, 3 gurudwara sahib and one agriculture cooprative society. Prabhjit Singh Dhanoa (Assistant Controller Finance and Accounts) belongs to this village.  . .

Administration
The village is administrated by a Sarpanch who is an elected representative of village as per constitution of India and Panchayati raj (India).

Child Sex Ratio details
The village population of children with an age group from 0-6 is 219 which makes up 9.50% of total population of village. Average Sex Ratio is 912 per 1000 males which is higher than  the state average of 895. The child Sex Ratio as per census is  766, lower  than  average of 846 in the state of Punjab.

Cast
The village  constitutes 16.57%  of Schedule Caste  and the village  doesn't have any Schedule Tribe population.

Villages in Ludhiana East Tehsil

External links
  Villages in Ludhiana East Tehsil

References

Villages in Ludhiana East tehsil